Euleucinodes is a monotypic moth genus of the family Crambidae described by Hahn William Capps in 1948. It contains only one species, Euleucinodes conifrons, described in the same publication, which is found in Peru.

References

Spilomelinae
Crambidae genera
Taxa named by Hahn William Capps